David Radebe (born 27 September 1979) is a South African former soccer player who played as a striker.

External links

1979 births
Living people
South African soccer players
South Africa international soccer players
Free State Stars F.C. players
Kaizer Chiefs F.C. players
Bidvest Wits F.C. players
Association football forwards
Moroka Swallows F.C. players
University of Pretoria F.C. players
Soccer players from the Free State (province)
Thanda Royal Zulu F.C. players
Santos F.C. (South Africa) players
Garankuwa United F.C. players
Mthatha Bucks F.C. players
Batau F.C. players
African Warriors F.C. players